QKENCHANT was a Central Intelligence Agency project used to provide security approvals on non-Agency personnel and facilities.

The project
In a memorandum to Assassination Records Review Board, dated 18 September 1998, Central Intelligence Agency states the following:

 QKENCHANT was the name of a [Central Intelligence] Agency project used to provide security approvals on non-Agency personnel and facilities.

In a memorandum for "JFK Declassification Project of CIA, dated 27 February 1998, the [redacted] sender entity states:
 QKENCHANT was a project for obtaining clearances, that is, Provisional Covert Security Approvals (PCSA) and Covert Security Approvals (CSA), with the office of security in connection with the acquisition of Directorate of Operations guidelines require that a PCSA/CSA be obtained in most instances before a <redacted> entity can be used as a <redacted>.

E. Howard Hunt 
Intelligence officer E. Howard Hunt was associated with QKENCHANT. Hunt, with G. Gordon Liddy and others, was one of the White House's "plumbers"—a secret team of operatives charged with fixing "leaks".

See also
CIA cryptonym
Assassination of John F. Kennedy
JFK Records Act

References

External links
Mary Ferrell Foundation
A Farewell to Justice: Jim Garrison, JFK's Assassination, and the Case That Should Have Changed History at Google Books

CIA cryptonyms
Central Intelligence Agency
National security of the United States